Saeed Changizian (born 13 December 1977) is an Iranian actor. He is best known for his acting in Modest Reception (2012), Rona, Azim's Mother (2018) and Mortal Wound (2021).

Career 
Changizian has participated in several plays in collaboration with Mehr Theatre Group. He has acted in various MTG productions including Summerless and Ivanov.

Filmography

Film

Web

Television

Theaters

References

External links 
 Rotten Tomatoes official website
 sbs official website
 Track TV official website
 deSingel official website on Amir Reza Koohestani and Mehr Theatre Group

1977 births
Living people
Male actors from Tehran
Iranian male film actors
People from Semnan, Iran
Iranian male stage actors
Iranian male television actors
21st-century Iranian male actors